Volodymyr Yermolenko (Єрмоленко Володимир Анатолійович; born 1980) is a Ukrainian philosopher, essayist, translator, doctor of political studies (School of Advanced Studies in Social Sciences: EHESS, Paris), candidate of philosophical sciences (Kyiv, 2009), and senior lecturer at the Kyiv-Mohyla Academy. He is laureate of the Yuri Shevelyov Prize (2018) and of the Petro Mohyla Award (2021).

Biography 
Yermolenko was born Kyiv to a family of philosophers. His father, Anatoly Mykolayovych Yermolenko, was director of the Institute of Philosophy. His mother taught philosophy at Kyiv Polytechnic Institute. He wrote his first philosophical work, "Buddhism and Western Culture", at the age of 15 for the Minor Academy of Sciences

In 2002, he graduated from NaUKMA, and in 2003 from the Central European University (Budapest). In 2011, he defended his doctoral thesis at the School of Advanced Studies in Social Sciences (EHESS, Paris). He teaches at the Kyiv-Mohyla Academy.

In 2020, together with Tetyana Oharkova, Yermolenko started the Kult podcast, dedicated to defining epochs in the history of culture and cult authors who had a great influence on the development of literature and culture.

Prizes 
2018, Yuri Shevelyov Prize for Fluid Ideologies
2018/ "Book of the Year" in 2 nominations, for Fluid Ideologies. 
2021, Petro Mohyla Prize: for Fluid Ideologies

Books 
The Storyteller and Philosopher Walter Benjamin and His Time, Krytyka, Ukrainian Scientific Institute of Harvard University, 2011
Distant Relatives, Krytyka, Kyiv-Mohyla Academy, 2015 
Ocean Catcher: The Story of Odysseus, Stary Lev, 2017.
Fluid ideologies. Ideas and Politics in Europe in the 19th and 20th Centuries, 2018.

Publications 

 Оповідач і філософ: Вальтер Беньямін та його час / В. Єрмоленко. — Київ: Критика, 2011. — 280 с.
 Далекі близькі. Есеї з філософії та літератури / В. Єрмоленко. — Львів: Видавництво Старого Лева, 2015. — 304 с.
 Ловець океану: Історія Одіссея / В. Єрмоленко. — Львів: Видавництво Старого Лева, 2017. — 216 с.
 «Плинні ідеології. Ідеї та політика в Європі ХІХ–ХХ століть»/ В.Єрмоленко — К.: ДУХ I ЛIТЕРА, 2018. — 480 с
From Pushkin to Putin: Russian Literature’s Imperial Ideology - Foreign Policy JUNE 25, 2022

Reference 

1980 births
Living people
Ukrainian philosophers
Ukrainian essayists
People from Kyiv